The Dundas Blues are a junior ice hockey team based in Dundas, Ontario, Canada.  They are members of the Bloomfield Division (South Conference) of the Provincial Junior Hockey League of the Ontario Hockey Association.

History
The team was founded in 1963 as the Dundas Merchants.  The Merchants played in the massive Central Junior C Hockey League.  In 1966, the league was divided up and the Merchants began playing in the Intercounty Junior C Hockey League.

In 1971, the team was promoted to the newly aligned Central Junior B Hockey League.  With the new league, the team was re-dubbed the Dundas Blues.

The Blues jumped to the newly formed Golden Horseshoe Junior B Hockey League in 1974.  They were members of this league until 1981.

The 1981 season saw them join the Niagara & District Junior C Hockey League.  A league that they stayed in until the end of the 2015-16 season. In the summer of 2016 the eight Southern Ontario Junior "C" leagues agreed to amalgamate and each league become a division in the Provincial Junior Hockey League. Two divisions also grouped into Conferences and the Niagara & District renamed the Bloomfield Division and aligned in the South Conference.

Junior C Hockey League is now called the PJHL (Provincial Junior Hockey League).

Season-by-season results

External links
Blues Homepage
OHA - Niagara & District website

Niagara Junior C Hockey League teams
Ice hockey teams in Hamilton, Ontario
1961 establishments in Ontario
Ice hockey clubs established in 1961